Bryopsidophyceae is an unaccepted class of chlorophyte green algae. The order Bryopsidales has been included in the class Ulvophyceae.

References

Green algae classes
Historically recognized algae taxa